This is a list of what are intended to be the notable top hotels by country, five or four star hotels, notable skyscraper landmarks or historic hotels which are covered in multiple reliable publications. It should not be a directory of every hotel in every country:

Haiti

 Christopher Hotel, Port-au-Prince
 Hôtel Montana, Port-au-Prince
 Hotel Oloffson, Port-au-Prince

Hong Kong

 Baden-Powell International House
 China Hong Kong City
 Disney's Hollywood Hotel
 Dorsett Wanchai Hong Kong Hotel
 Eaton Hotel Hong Kong
 The Excelsior
 Four Seasons Hotel Hong Kong
 Grand Hyatt Hong Kong
 Hong Kong Disneyland Hotel
 Hong Kong Gold Coast Hotel
 Hong Kong Hilton
 Hong Kong Hotel
 Hong Kong SkyCity
 Hotel Indigo Hong Kong Island
 Hotel Panorama
 Hyatt Regency Hong Kong
 Hyatt Regency Sha Tin
 InterContinental Hong Kong
 International Commerce Centre
 International Finance Centre
 Island Shangri-La, Hong Kong
 JW Marriott Hong Kong
 Kowloon Shangri-La
 The Landmark Mandarin Oriental Hotel
 Langham Place, Hong Kong
 Langham Place Hotel
 Mandarin Oriental, Hong Kong
 Le Méridien Cyberport Hotel
 Novotel Century Hong Kong
 Novotel Citygate Hong Kong
 Novotel Nathan Road Kowloon Hong Kong
 Panda Hotel
 The Peak Hotel
 The Peninsula Hong Kong
 Regal Hotels International
 Ritz-Carlton Hong Kong, Kowloon
 Royal Park Hotel
 Royal Plaza Hotel
 W Hong Kong

Hungary

Balatonfüred
 Hotel Marina Balatonfüred
 Hotel Annabella, Balatonfüred
 Hotel Silverine Lake Resort, Balatonfüred

Budapest

 Boscolo Budapest Hotel
 Continental Hotel Zara, Budapest
 Corinthia Hotel Budapest
 Danubius Hotel Astoria, Budapest
 Four Seasons Hotel Gresham Palace Budapest
 Hilton Budapest
 Hotel Gellért, Budapest
 InterContinental Budapest
 Kempinski Hotel Corvinus, Budapest

Győr
 Barokk Hotel Promenád Győr

References

H